The 1998 Grote Prijs Jef Scherens was the 32nd edition of the Grote Prijs Jef Scherens cycle race and was held on 6 September 1998. The race started and finished in Leuven. The race was won by Jo Planckaert.

General classification

References

1998
1998 in road cycling
1998 in Belgian sport
September 1998 sports events in Europe